India Kawasaki Motors Private Limited (IKM) is an Indian motorcycle retailer. It was established in May 2010 in Pune, Maharashtra, as a wholly owned subsidiary of Kawasaki Heavy Industries Motorcycle & Engine, Japan Ltd. for imports and sales of motorcycles. Kawasaki made a technical assistance agreement with Bajaj Auto Ltd. in 1984, and cooperated to expand production and sales of motorcycles in India. In November 2016 India Kawasaki Motors decided to break ties with Bajaj Auto Ltd. for sales and service from April 2017 and sell its motorcycles through its own network.

India Kawasaki Motors currently  sells the Ninja 300, Ninja 400, Ninja 650, Ninja 1000, Z650, Z650 RS, Z900, ZH2, ZH2 SE, Versys 650, Versys 1000, Vulcan S, Ninja ZX-10R, Ninja H2, Ninja H2R and Ninja H2Carbon are sold through Kawasaki exclusive dealerships. In the past, Kawasaki manufactured commuter bikes such as KB100, 4S Champion, KB125, Boxer, Aspire, Caliber, Wind and Eliminator jointly with Indian partner Bajaj Auto Ltd. IKM’s annual capacity currently stands at 2,500-3,000 units.

Vehicles

Sports Bikes
 Ninja H2R
 Ninja H2
 Ninja H2 CARBON
 Ninja ZX-14R
 Ninja ZX-10RR
 Ninja ZX-10R
 Ninja ZX-6R
 Ninja 1000
 Ninja 650
 Ninja 400
 Ninja 300
 ZH2
 ZH2 SE
 Z900
 Z650
 Versys 1000
 Versys 650
 Versys X-300

Cruiser Bike 
vulcan s

Dirt Bikes 
 KLX 110
 KLX 140
 KLX 450R
 KX 100
 KX 250
 KX 450F

Discontinued

Motorcycles/Sports Bikes
 Kawasaki Ninja 250R
 Kawasaki ER-6N 650
 Kawasaki Z800
 Kawasaki KB100
 Kawasaki Boxer
 Kawasaki Caliber
 Kawasaki Caliber 115
 Kawasaki Caliber Croma
 Kawasaki Aspire
 Kawasaki Wind 125
 Kawasaki Eliminator
 Kawasaki 4S Champion
 Kawasaki Z250
 Kawasaki KZ440

References

Kawasaki Heavy Industries
Indian subsidiaries of foreign companies
Manufacturing companies based in Pune
Motorcycle manufacturers of India
Retail companies of India
Indian companies established in 2010
2010 establishments in Maharashtra
Retail companies established in 2010